The 1988 UEFA European Under-21 Championship, which spanned two years (1986–88), had 30 entrants.  The Republic of Ireland competed for the first time.  France U-21s won the competition.

The 30 national teams were divided into eight groups (six groups of 4 + two groups of 3). The group winners played off against each other on a two-legged home-and-away basis until the winner was decided.  There was no finals tournament or third-place playoff.

Qualifying stage

Draw
The allocation of teams into qualifying groups was based on that of UEFA Euro 1988 qualifying tournament with several changes, reflecting the absence of some nations:
 Group 1 featured the same nations
 Group 2 did not include Malta
 Group 3 did not include Iceland (moved to Group 6)
 Group 4 did not include Northern Ireland
 Group 5 did not include Netherlands (moved to Group 8)
 Group 6 did not include Wales, but included Iceland (moved from Group 3)
 Group 7 did not include Bulgaria and Luxembourg (both moved to Group 8)
 Group 8 composed of Bulgaria and Luxembourg (both moved from Group 7), Netherlands (moved from Group 5) and West Germany (who did not participate in senior Euro qualification)

Qualified teams

1 Bold indicates champion for that year

Squads 
See 1988 UEFA European Under-21 Championship squads

Knockout stage

Quarter-finals

First leg

Second leg

Semi-finals

First leg

Second leg

Final

First leg

Second leg

Goalscorers
5 goals
 Aris Karasavvidis

4 goals
 Stéphane Paille

3 goals
 Eric Cantona
 Franck Sauzée

1 goal

 Václav Němeček
 Marcel Litoš
 Paul Gascoigne
 Garry Parker
 Gary Porter
 Paul Stewart
 David White
 Jocelyn Angloma
 Jean-Luc Dogon
 Franck Silvestre
 Stefanos Borbokis
 Kostas Ikonomidis
 Giorgos Kapouranis
 Massimo Ciocci
 Paolo Maldini
 Ruggiero Rizzitelli
 Henk Fraser 
 John van Loen
 Gerrit Plomp
 Eric Viscaal 
 Rob Witschge
 Loren

Own goal
 Pagonis Vakalopoulos (playing against Czechoslovakia)
 Franck Silvestre (playing against England)

References

External links 
 Results Archive at uefa.com
 RSSSF Results Archive ''at rsssf.com

1988
1986–87 in European football
1987–88 in European football
1988 in youth association football